Walter Rice may refer to:

Walter Rice (architect) (1866–1930), an American architect, inventor and engineer 
Walter Rice (MP), Welsh MP for Carmarthen
Walter Rice, 7th Baron Dynevor (1873-1856)
Walter Francis Rice, Lieutenant Governor of Burma
Walter Herbert Rice (born 1937)  American judge